Jadrija is a city district in Šibenik, Croatia. It is a popular seaside resort located on a man-made peninsula at the entrance of the St. Anthony Channel leading to Šibenik.

Jadrija was logged into the registry of protected Croatian cultural heritage architectural sites.

It got its name from the island of Saint Andreas (Sveti Andrija) that was connected in 1922 to the mainland by man. It is a first official beach for the town of Šibenik with a long history spanning over 95 years. The idea to build a city beach came to Šime Grubišić-Rovilo, Šibenik's first tour guide, while the local pine forest was planted by another local Ante Frua, known for his prolific work of tree planting in the forests of Šibenik.

The lighthouse, at the end of the peninsula, was built in 1871 under the pretext of "enlightening of east Adriatic coast" by the Austro-Hungarian Empire, beginning in 1816, with the aim of establishing safer sea trade routes, which was important to the Empire. The main curiosity of the lighthouse is its east wall where original portraits–sculptures of medieval Šibenik aristocrats could be found. Namely, after the restoration of the famous Šibenik Cathedral (dating back to 1431; UNESCO World Heritage Site since 1979) several of the original sculptures, which were removed from the cathedral and placed at the lighthouse, where they still reside to this day. The lighthouse itself remains functional, acting as a traffic light for the St. Anthony Channel. The passage is too narrow to accommodate more than one large ship at a time. The Jadrija lighthouse offers a perfect view of the nearby St. Nicholas Fortress, built between 1535 and 1550.

Jadrija is one of the best places in Croatia to wind surf; many locals have their summerhouses here. Nearby towns including Vodice and Srima, and nearby islands including Prvić, Zlarin, Kaprije and Žirje are ideal for day trips going by public boat from Šibenik.

The closest national park is the Krka National Park.

References 

Populated places in Šibenik-Knin County